Cain Hope Felder (June 9, 1943 – October 1, 2019) was an American biblical scholar, serving as professor of New Testament language and literature and editor of The Journal of Religious Thought at the Howard University School of Divinity. He also served as chair of the Doctor of Philosophy program and immediate past chair of the Doctor of Ministry program. He had been on Howard's faculty from 1981 until his retirement in 2016.

Biography
Prior to coming to Howard, he taught within the Department of Biblical Studies (1978–1981) at Princeton Theological Seminary. From 1969 to 1972, Felder worked as the first executive director of Black Methodists for Church Renewal, the black caucus of the United Methodist Church, which was headquartered in Atlanta, Georgia. Originally ordained as an elder in the United Methodist Church, he served as pastor of Grace United Methodist Church in New York City (1975–1977). Until his death, Felder served as an elder in the Second Episcopal District of the African Methodist Episcopal Church, where he was appointed by Bishop Adam Jefferson Richardson as the resident biblical scholar for the district.

From 1998 to 2001, Felder served as chair of the implementation panel for the National Center for African American Heritage & Culture at Howard University. He was on Howard's faculty from 1981-2016, having come to Washington from Princeton Theological Seminary, where he taught as a member of the Department of Biblical Studies (1978–1981).

His publications include True to Our Native Land (Augsburg Fortress, May, 2007);  Troubling Biblical Waters: Race, Class, and Family (Orbis Books, 1989) – 16th printing; and The Original African Heritage Study Bible (Winston Publishing Company, 1993).   
 
Felder held Doctor of Philosophy and Master of Philosophy degrees in biblical languages and literature from Columbia University in New York; a Master of Divinity degree from Union Theological Seminary in New York; a Diploma of Theology from Mansfield College at the University of Oxford in England; a Bachelor of Arts degree in philosophy, Greek, and Latin from Howard University in Washington, DC. He received his secondary education at the Boston Latin School.

Felder died on October 1, 2019 at his Mobile, Alabama at the age of 76.

Selected works

Thesis

Books

Edited by

References

1943 births
2019 deaths
20th-century Methodist ministers
20th-century scholars
21st-century Methodist ministers
21st-century scholars
Academics from South Carolina
African Americans in South Carolina
African Methodist Episcopal Church clergy
American biblical scholars
American United Methodist clergy
Christians from South Carolina
Columbia University alumni
Howard University alumni
Howard University faculty
New Testament scholars
People from Aiken, South Carolina
Princeton Theological Seminary faculty
Religious leaders from South Carolina
Union Theological Seminary (New York City) alumni
Writers from South Carolina
African-American biblical scholars